The Preston and Longridge Railway (P&LR) was a branch line in Lancashire, England. Originally designed to carry quarried stone in horse-drawn wagons, it became part of an ambitious plan to link the Lancashire coast to the heart of Yorkshire. The ambition was never achieved, but the line continued to carry passengers until 1930 and goods until 1967.

Early history

The Preston and Longridge Railway Company was set up in 1836 to build a tramway from the newly opened Tootle Heights Quarry in Longridge to Preston.

Wagons were horse-drawn from Preston uphill to Longridge. Wagons ran by gravity in the opposite direction as far as Ribbleton, which was then a village just outside Preston. Horses were used for the final two miles (3 km) to Deepdale. Longridge ashlar sandstone was widely used in the region, for example in the building of Lancaster Town Hall, Bolton Town Hall, Preston railway station and Liverpool Docks.

Development

In 1846, the Fleetwood, Preston and West Riding Junction Railway (FP&WRR) Company was set up. It had an ambitious plan to link Fleetwood on the Lancashire coast to Leeds and Bradford in Yorkshire. It would link the existing Preston and Wyre Joint Railway to the Longridge line in Preston, and build a new line from  via Ribchester, Hurst Green and Clitheroe to Skipton, where it would join the proposed Leeds and Bradford Extension Railway. The line would give Lancashire passengers access to the spa towns of Harrogate and Knaresborough, and beauty spots such as Bolton Abbey. Reciprocally, it would give Yorkshire passengers access to the seaside resorts of Fleetwood and Blackpool. Freight trains would carry cattle from Craven Valley, and stone from quarries near Clitheroe as well as from Longridge. Stonyhurst College would be within a mile of the line and would be able to use it to bring in supplies as well as pupils.

The P&LR was duly leased to the FP&WRR. The line was adapted for steam and the first steam-hauled train ran on Whit Monday 1848.

In 1850, a double-track extension was built connecting to the existing line a few hundred yards east of the  terminus. The extension was initially used for goods only.

The first work on the Grimsargh to Skipton line was the excavation of a short cutting (which still exists) south of Hurst Green (at ), but then the project was abandoned. In 1852, the FP&WRR Company collapsed. The Preston and Longridge Railway acquired the engines and rolling stock of the collapsed company in lieu of owed rental fees.

However, in 1856 a reformed Fleetwood, Preston and West Riding Junction Railway Company purchased the line. The original  terminus was closed to passengers but continued to be used for goods.

By 1866, the plan to extend the line to Yorkshire had been revived. Fearing that the rival Midland Railway would buy the line to gain access to Preston, the Lancashire and Yorkshire Railway (L&YR) bought the line instead. From the following year, the line was owned jointly by the L&YR and the London and North Western Railway (LNWR).

In 1885, Maudland Bridge Station was closed and passenger trains ran on to the adjacent LNWR main line to Preston Station, allowing connections to other railway lines for the first time.

Whittingham Hospital branch

As well as supplies, hospital staff and visitors were carried free of charge in converted goods brake vans. Trains (as many as twelve per day) were timed to connect with passenger trains at Grimsargh.

The locomotives used on the hospital branch were industrial types with the exception of the ex-London, Brighton and South Coast Railway no. 357, Riddlesdown, which was purchased in February 1948 from British Railways for £745.

The hospital line continued to operate long after the main branch closed to passengers in 1930. The hospital trains were now timed to connect with bus services at Grimsargh. The line eventually closed on 29 June 1957.

Decline

In 1918 there was another plan to extend the railway from Longridge to Yorkshire along the Loud and Hodder valleys to Whitewell, Tosside, Wigglesworth and Hellifield, but the plan was never implemented. This plan was revived once more in 1924 in connection with the Stocks Reservoir scheme and a Light Railway Order was confirmed on 19 March, however no further action was taken.

By 1930 the popularity of bus travel caused the line to close to passengers. The line to Longridge remained open to goods traffic until November 1967.

Goods traffic continued to use part of the line as far as the Courtaulds factory at Red Scar, until the last train worked by class 25 diesel, number 25 142 on Friday 8 February 1980. All that now remained of the whole line was a Y-shaped link between the West Coast Main Line and coal yards at the site of the original Deepdale Street terminus. This, too, was closed in the 1990s, although the tracks for this section were never taken up.

Remains

The track through Miley Tunnel, though rusty and overgrown, still exists.

The line’s route in Preston between Blackpool Road and Red Scar is now a cycle path and footpath. It is planned to extend the path to Grimsargh.

In Longridge, a portal to a blocked-off tunnel under Higher Road that led to Tootle Heights Quarry is a Grade II listed building.

In 2003, the Preston City Link Canal Trust was formed with a plan to reopen part of the Lancaster Canal to a new marina to be constructed in the vicinity of the former Maudland Bridge railway station. One option being considered was to reopen the Longridge line as far as Deepdale or Ribbleton, the line passing by viaduct over the new marina.

In 2010, light rail manufacturer Trampower UK opened negotiations to use a segment of the former route as a tram demonstrator line. Initially, Trampower UK would use the line from the Miley Tunnel portal to Ribbleton, however their long term ambition is to provide a service on the line from the M6 Junction 31A to Preston city centre.

Notes

References

 Aubertin, C. (2006) "Solving a Victorian Problem", Steam World, 232 (October), p. 26-31
 Biddle, G. (1989) The Railways Around Preston — A Historical Review, Scenes from the Past: No. 6, Foxline Publishing, 
 Bowtell, H.D. (1988) Lesser Railways of Bowland Forest and Craven Country - and the dam builders in the age of steam, Platewell Press, 
 Gilbert, A.C. and Knight, N.R. (1975) Railways around Lancashire, Manchester Transport Museum Society, 
 
 
 
 Hilbert, M. (1998) "Coal To Deepdale No More", Traction magazine 42, April 1998.
 Hunt, D. (2003) The Wharncliffe Companion to Preston — An A to Z of Local History, Wharncliffe Books, Barnsley, .
 Mitchell, L., Hopkins, B. and Newman, C.  , Lancashire County Council and Egerton Lea Consultancy, July 2006, accessed 15 June 2007.
 Parker, N. (1972) The Preston and Longridge Railway, Oakwood Library of Railway History No. 30, Lingfield: Oakwood Press
 Pattinson, M. (Ed.) (1999) Longridge — The Way we Were, Hudson History of Settle, 
 Potter, T. (1993) Reflections on Preston, Wilmslow: Sigma Leisure, 
 Suggitt, G. (2003, revised 2004) Lost Railways of Lancashire, Countryside Books, Newbury, 
 Till, J.M. (1993) A History of Longridge and its People, Carnegie Publishing, Preston, 
 Welch, M.S. (2004) Lancashire Steam Finale, Runpast Publishing, Cheltenham,

External links

 Villages around the Ribble Valley — Longridge 
 The History of Longridge 
 Preston Station : Past & Present - page covering the Longridge line including recent and older photos
 British Railways in 1960 - The Longridge Branch
 British Railways in 1960 - The Deepdale Branch
 'Tunnel Visions' Interactive website about Miley Tunnel

Closed railway lines in North West England
Lancashire and Yorkshire Railway
Early British railway companies
Historic transport in Lancashire
Railway companies established in 1836
Railway lines opened in 1840
Railway companies disestablished in 1847
Transport in the City of Preston
Railway lines closed in 1967
1836 establishments in England
Horse-drawn railways
1967 disestablishments in England
British companies disestablished in 1847
British companies established in 1836